Gyula Móri (born 6 March 1914, date of death unknown) was a Hungarian wrestler. He competed in the men's Greco-Roman featherweight at the 1936 Summer Olympics.

References

External links
 

1914 births
Year of death missing
Hungarian male sport wrestlers
Olympic wrestlers of Hungary
Wrestlers at the 1936 Summer Olympics
Place of birth missing
20th-century Hungarian people